Government Dyal Singh Graduate College, Lahore is a college for graduate and post-graduate students affiliated to Board of Intermediate and Secondary Education, Lahore and University of the Punjab, Lahore, Pakistan.

History
The college was founded in accordance with the will  Dyal Singh, in Lahore to implant Brahmo ideas. During Socio-Cultural reform movement in Indian subcontinent , in 1910 , Dayal singh  was influenced by rational , scientific ideas of Brahmo samaj (started by Raja Rammohan Roy) . He is known as the "founder of The Tribune" and the one who bequeathed his largely self-earned assets including buildings in Lahore and land in Amritsar, Lahore and Gurdaspur districts worth about Rs.30 lakh in 1898 to two trusts that established Dyal Singh College and Dyal Singh Public Library in Lahore.

The college was run by an educational trust, consisted of Dayal Singh College, Dayal Singh Library, Dayal Singh Majithia Hall and Dayal Singh Mansions at The Mall Lahore, adjacent to Lahore High Court.

Dyal Singh was a philanthropist and a lover of education. A man of great vision and action, he donated all his assets for the propagation of education. He gave almost all his property in Lahore, Pakistan for the establishment of the college.

Programs offered
HSSC groups

Compulsory subjects: 
 English
 Urdu
Islamic Education/Pak. Studies

Pre-medical - Physics, Chemistry, Biology

Pre-engineering - Physics, Chemistry, Mathematics

General Science - Statistics, Mathematics, Economics

Computer Science (ICS) 
 Physics, Mathematics, Computer Science 
 Statistics, Mathematics, Computer Science 
 Economics, Mathematics, Computer Science

Commerce group (I.COM) - Accounting, Economics, Business, Math, Principals of Commerce

Arts group 
 Economics, Civics, Education 
 Economics, Civics, Punjabi 
 Economics, Psychology, Education 
 Islamiat, Civics, Education 
 Islamiat, Civics, Punjabi 
 Islamiat, Civics, Persian
 Islamiat, Civics, Arabic 
 Islamiat, Civics, Urdu Advance 
 Islamiat, Education, Arabic 
 Islamiat, Education, Urdu Advance 
 Islamiat, Education, Psychology 
 Islamiat, Psychology, Persian 
 Physical Education, Civics, Arabic 
 Physical Education, Civics, Education 
 Physical Education, Civics, Urdu Advance 
 Physical Education, Civics, Punjabi 
 Physical Education, Psychology, Education 
 Physical Education, Psychology, Persian 
 History, Psychology, Persian 
 History, Psychology, Education

BSc. groups

Compulsory subjects: 
 English
 Islamic Education
 Pak. Studies

Bachelor of Science
 Botany, Zoology, Chemistry 
 Physics, Chemistry, Mathematics (G) 
 Economics, Statistics, Mathematics (G) 
Statistics, Mathematics, Computer Science
 Physics, Mathematics A course, Mathematics B course 
 Statistics, Mathematics A course, Mathematics B course

B.A groups
Compulsory subjects: 
 English
 Islamic Education/Pak. Studies

Bachelor of Arts
 Economics, Education, Statistics (opt) 
 Economics, Political Science, Statistics (opt) 
 Economics, Political Science, Persian (opt) 
 Economics, Punjabi, Arabic (opt) 
 Islamiat, Arabic, Punjabi (opt) 
 Islamiat, Education, Punjabi (opt) 
 Islamiat, Education, Arabic (opt) 
 Islamiat, Education, Persian (opt) 
 Islamiat, Political Science, Punjabi (opt) 
 Islamiat, Political Science, Arabic (opt) 
 Islamiat, Political Science, Persian (opt) 
 Islamiat, Punjabi, Urdu (opt) 
 Islamiat, Punjabi, Arabic (opt) 
 Islamiat, Punjabi, Persian (opt) 
 Islamiat, History, Persian (opt) 
 Islamiat, Education, Punjabi (opt) 
 Islamiat, Persian, Urdu (opt) 
 Economics History, Persian (opt) 
 Economics, Persian, Arabic (opt)

B.COM (IT) group
 BC-301 Business Statistics & Mathematics 
 BC-302 Computer Application in Business 
 BC-303 Economics 
 BC-304 Financial Accounting 
 BC-305 Functional English 
 BC-306 Introduction to Business 
 BC-307 Money Banking And Finance 
 BC-308 Islamic Studies / Ethical Behaviours

Masters 
 MSc Mathematics
 MA English

College uniform
 Summer: white shirt and steel-grey trousers or white shalwar qameez 
 Winter: white shirt and steel-grey trousers or white shalwar qameez, navy blue blazer/sweater/jersey

Location 
The college is on Nisbat Road, near Lakshami Chowk, Lahore, Pakistan.

Notable faculty members
 Sadhu T.L. Vaswani, principal, 1912-1915

References 

Dyal Singh Majithia

External links
 University of the Punjab - Affiliation
 Govt. Dyal Singh College Lahore
 Panoramio Group
 Facebook
 Dyal Singh College Delhi
 Dyal Singh College Karnal
 Dyal Singh Public School Karnal
 Dyal Singh Public School Jagadhari
 Dayal Singh Trust Library Lahore

Universities and colleges in Lahore
University of the Punjab